The N11 or National Highway 11 is a national highway in Ghana that begins at Bolgatanga in the Upper East Region (N10) and runs east to Bawku, where it intersects with the N2. The N11 is 110.8 km long.

Route
Major towns and cities along the route of the N11 include Bolgatanga, Zuarungu, Zebilla and Bawku.

See also 
Ghana Road Network

References

Roads in Ghana